Bahadarwala (Urdu: چاہ بہادر والا; Saraiki: چاہ بہاذر آلا) is a village in the Bhakkar District of Punjab, Pakistan.

Villages in Bhakkar District
Bhakkar District